East Ridge High School is a public secondary school located in Lick Creek, Kentucky, United States.

History
East Ridge High School was built in 2002 by Elliott Contracting Inc. It was built for students from three smaller high schools: Millard High School, Elkhorn City High School, and Feds Creek High School. The school's first principal was Ralph Kilgore, who retired in 2007. Starting in the 2007–2008 year, Kevin Justice became principal with Mike Potter as assistant principal. During the 2009-2010 year, Melinda Potter also became Assistant principal.

Academics
Under coach Joey W. Hamilton, the East Ridge High School Academic Team has won two consecutive championship titles in the 59th district, as well as two additional district wins in recent years.

2010 59th District Governors Cup Champions
2011 59th District Governors Cup Champions
2015 59th District Governors Cup Champions
2017 59th District Governors Cup Champions

Athletics
Although a relatively new school, the athletic program of East Ridge High School has become competitive thus far, winning championships below the state level.

On August 1, 2011 the Athletic Department of East Ridge High School announced the hiring of former Bourbon County and University of Kentucky Basketball superstar Preston "Master Blaster" LeMaster.

Football

Volleyball

District Championships: 2003, 2006, 2007, 2009, 2011, 2012

Boys' basketball

District Championships: 2003, 2004

Regional Championships: 2004

Girls' basketball

District Championships: 2010, 2011

Baseball

District Championships: 2008

References

Schools in Pike County, Kentucky
Public high schools in Kentucky
Educational institutions established in 2002
2002 establishments in Kentucky